Clifford Jack Andrews (6 August 1912 – 11 December 1973) was an English first-class cricketer. Andrews was a right-handed batsman who fielded as a wicket-keeper.  He was born in Swindon, Wiltshire.

Andrews made his first-class debut for Hampshire against Cambridge University.  He next appeared in first-class cricket for Hampshire following World War II, playing a further 6 matches, the last of which came against Glamorgan.  In his 7 first-class matches, he scored 127 runs at an average of 14.11, with a high score of 29.  Behind the stumps he took 6 catches and made a single stumping.

Outside of cricket, Andrews was a police officer, employed by Southampton City Police, based in Southampton.  He played cricket for the cities police force during the war.  He was the younger brother of the Somerset all-rounder Bill Andrews, and was known in his family as "Jack".  He died in Eastleigh, Hampshire, on 11 December 1973.

References

External links
Clifford Andrews at ESPNcricinfo
Clifford Andrews at CricketArchive

1912 births
1973 deaths
Sportspeople from Swindon
English cricketers
Hampshire cricketers
Southampton City Police officers
Wicket-keepers